Ivan Liutarevich (born 20 February 1996) is a Belarusian tennis player.

Liutarevich has a career high ATP singles ranking of 693 achieved on 22 August 2022. He also has a career high doubles ranking of 234 achieved on 30 January 2023.

Liutarevich has won 1 ATP Challenger doubles title at the 2023 Vitas Gerulaitis Cup with Vladyslav Manafov.

Tour finals

Singles

Doubles

References

External links
 
 

1996 births
Living people
Belarusian male tennis players
Sportspeople from Minsk